Järise may refer to several places in Estonia:
 Järise, Lääne County, village in Lihula Parish, Lääne County
 Järise, Saare County, village in Mustjala Parish, Saare County